Player is a 2018 South Korean television series starring Song Seung-heon, Krystal Jung, Lee Si-eon, and Tae Won-suk. The first season aired on OCN from September 29 to November 11, 2018, every Saturdays and Sundays at 22:20 (KST).

The series was renewed for a second season.

Synopsis
The story about the four talented individuals in their respective fields who create an elite team to solve crimes in partnership with a righteous prosecutor. Together, they confiscate black money and make sure that those who earn money through crimes will be arrested.

Cast

Main
 Song Seung-heon as Kang Ha-ri / Choi Soo-hyuk, a veteran conman from a family of investigators who was born bold and gifted with words.
 Krystal Jung as Cha Ah-ryung, a skilled driver who grew up in an orphanage after being abandoned by her parents.
 Lee Si-eon as Lim Byung-min, a talented hacker who had a past with Chairman Chun.
  as Do Jin-woong, a powerful fighter who had accidentally worked for "that person".

Supporting

Public Prosecutors' Office
 Kim Won-hae as Prosecutor Jang In-gyu, the prosecutor who teamed up with Ha-ri and his team.
 Ahn Se-ho as Investigator Maeng Ji-hoon
 Lee Hwang-ui as Yoo Ki-hoon

Target
 Kim Jong-tae as "that person" (real name: Yeon Je-suk), a consultant and power broker for politicians.
 Kwak Ja-hyung as Chun Dong-seob

People around Ha-ri
 Huh Joon-ho as Choi Hyun-gi, Ha-ri's father and former team leader of Special Corruption Division.
 Yoo Ye-bin as Cho Yeon-hee, a doctor and the only person who knows Ha-ri's past.

Others
 Min Joon-hyun as Team Leader Shim Dal-soo
 Kang Min-tae as gangster
 Kim Hyung-mook as Na Won-hak
 Lee Hwa-ryong
 Min Joon-hyun
 Kim Sung-cheol as Ji Sung-goo
 Lee Chung-mi as Yang Hae-joo	
 Jin Mo as Wang Seob
 Kim Seo-kyung

Special appearances
 Yoo Seung-ho as a security guard (Ep. 1)
 Hong Seok-cheon as a driving instructor (Ep. 1)
 Wang Ji-hye as Ryu Hyun-ja (Ep. 7–8)
 Kim Ki-doo as a thug

Production
Early working titles of the series were Hustle and Round.

On July 12, 2022, it was announced that the series will return with second season in the second half of 2023 under the tentative title Player: War of the Thieves. On January 27, 2023, it was reported that filming was scheduled to begin in March 2023, and actresses Oh Yeon-seo and Jang Gyu-ri are in talks for the main roles.

Original soundtrack

Part 1

Part 2

Part 3

Part 4

Part 5

Part 6

Viewership

Notes

References

External links
  
 Player at Studio Dragon 
 Player at iWill Media 
 
 

OCN television dramas
Television series by Studio Dragon
Korean-language television shows
South Korean action television series
South Korean crime television series
Television series by IWill Media
2018 South Korean television series debuts